Ardenne High School is a prominent coeducational, first-to-sixth form secondary school located in St. Andrew, Jamaica. The institution is best known for its high academic standards, among the highest in the Caribbean, and for its achievements in the performing arts and several sports, most notably basketball and netball. The school's principal is Miss Nadine A Molloy.

Regarded by some as one of the top secondary institutions in Jamaica, Ardenne High has consistently performed extremely well in examinations regulated by the Caribbean Examinations Council (CXC). Ardenne produced the top performer in the Sciences, Daniel Thomas, in 2004 and Jamar Hamilton, Jamaica's best overall performer in 2009, both in CXC's CSEC examinations. In 2013 Ardenne was pronounced the Caribbean Advanced Proficiency Examination (CAPE) School of the Year for 213 in the region. This award is given for producing the top Caribbean Examinations Council (CXC) CAPE student of the year, Dea Thomas. in 2016 Ardenne was again named the Caribbean Advanced Proficiency Examination (CAPE) School of the Year award offered by the Caribbean Examinations Council (CXC) when Ardenne won the Dennis Irvine Award for producing the top CAPE student - Varna Thomas, Dea's younger sister. Both sisters passed 12 units over the two years of sixth form. 

The school continues to do well in the 2020 external examinations with 94. 48% of the entries at the CXC CSEC level gaining a pass and 96.8% at the CXC CAPE level gaining a pass. The quality of passes has shown a 5% improvement over the last five years.

Of the 302 students in 2020

 293 or 96.3% achieved a pass in Mathematics 

 301 or 99.6% achieved a pass in  English

Of the 302 students in 2020

  293 or 97% achieved passes in 5 or more subjects with Mathematics and/or English

  208 or 69% achieved passes in 8 or more subjects with Mathematics and /or English

The school has won Television Jamaica's Schools Challenge Quiz competition seven times, in 1973, 1997, 1998, 2000, 2013, 2015 and 2020 ahead of Calabar High School, Wolmer's Boys School and Munro College with five wins and trailing Kingston College with eleven wins.

Between 2000 and 2008, Ardenne's basketball team won a total of fifteen championships. They were one girls championship in 2001, three conference championships (under 14), four national championships (under 14), four league championships (under 16), two national championships (under 16) and one league championship (under 19).

The Cricket teams have shown significant progress moving from a B league team to an A League team since 2015. The school has also has become competitive in table tennis winning a title each year since 2015 when they took home the Girls Under 16 trophy. Ardenne High School is proud of its performing arts groups of students whose performance is outstanding. The group is responsible for the annually acclaimed Christmas pageant, tree lighting ceremony and fireworks show. This production can involve as many as six hundred students, teachers and coaches. Ardenne High School has copped the prestigious Marcus Garvey Award for Excellence in the Performing Arts for a 9 consecutive years since 2013.

COVID-19

On March 12, 2021 when schools closed in Jamaica owning the pandemic, Ardenne was able to transition to teaching in the virtual space. This was possible because of the extensive investment in technology infrastructure and teacher/staff capacity building that the school had engaged in for the previous three years. The school had also just rolled out a Bring Your Own Device policy (BYOD) that required students to own and take to school, for teaching, learning and assessment purposes, a Chromebook. The school has remained online with limited in-person classes since the pandemic began reaching from 88-100% of the students including administering full two paper exams remotely.  This pivoting has received strong support from all stakeholders, notably the alumni who has provided a number of devices and other support.

History
In 1907, just after the great earthquake that destroyed much of Kingston, the Rev. George and Nellie Olson came to Jamaica as Church of God missionaries from Anderson, Indiana in the United States, where the Church of God has its headquarters. In 1927, they began the first school at High Holborn Street in Kingston with an enrollment of five students including the Olson's daughter Mary Olson. In 1929 the Ardenne property of 12 acres was purchased through funds received from the Missionary Board of the Church of God in the U.S. and other private donors. The main block of buildings was erected. However, it was not until January 1938 that the school was transferred to its present location.

Nellie Olson, the first principal, held office until 1944 when she was succeeded by her daughter Mary Olson. Mary Olson served as principal through most of the schools formative years until 1969 when E.M. Claire Gayle, who had previously served as vice principal, succeeded her. Gayle was succeeded by the fourth principal, Roy J. Ebanks in 1979. When he retired in 1996, Winston Roberts became the fifth principal after serving as vice principal from 1979. During the interim May 1998 to December 1999, as a result of Roberts' illness and ultimate death, Erma J. Hutton served as acting principal. Esther Tyson assumed responsibility as the sixth principal in January 2000, until September 2011. The Reverend Claude Ellis served as acting principal until Miss Nadine A Molloy, past president of the Jamaica Teachers' Association, was appointed the school's seventh principal in September 2012.

School Song
School Song: (written by Vincent Kelly, alumnus)

Ye valiant youth arise, 
And join life's glorious fray, 
With God as guide, 
He will provide strength to conquer day to day. 
In hallowed hall or field, 
We'll strive but never yield; 
We will fight with our might, 
Undefeated be the conflict mild or heated: 
Brave and strong, shunning wrong 
we will march along 
To the future's brighter ray.

With loyalty and pride, 
We'll shield our noble name, 
What'er assail it shall ne’er
prevail, we'll conquer just the same: 
With banner high, unfurled, 
A symbol to the world 
Of the zeal that we feel in pursuing what we’re doing, ever viewing 
The bright crest of the best 
That will crown our quest, 
And fan Ardenne's glorious flame.

Achievements

 First Black Spelling Bee Champion, Jody Anne Maxwell 1998, in the 71st Scripps National Spelling Bee
 First Female Architect in the Caribbean' Verna Panton
 First Miconian to receive a Cornel Scholarship 1961, Hermon Saunders
 First Female President of York College, Dr Marcia Keisz
 First Jamaican to win a basketball scholarship to the United States, Wayne Sappleton, who later played in the NBA and the Italian league
 First Sir Alexander Bustamante Scholar, Karl Isaacs, 1970
 First John J Mills Scholars 1978, Rosemarie Grant
 First Grace Kennedy Scholar, 1980 Maynard Mcintosh 
 Ardenne High was named the most sought after school in the corporate area in 2001.
 According to the Dennis Minott Academic Report 2004, Ardenne was one of six schools to have an acceptable pass rate for CSEC mathematics.
 In 2006 Ardenne High was named the third most sought after school in Jamaica.
 According to the 2008-2009 statistical academic review of the University of the West Indies, Ardenne High had the second highest number of Undergraduates.
 In 2007-2010 Ardenne produced Jamaican Scholars, such as Daniel Thomas and Akeem Smith, who were recipients of the BBVA Ruta Quetzal Scholarship. Thomas was a science genius and Smith was able to memorize several languages and recite textbooks.
 Examinations Ardenne High had the second highest number of students placing in the top in the Caribbean for various CSEC subjects.
 For 2013 csec exams Ardenne High had the highest average.
 For 2013, Dea Thomas was the top CAPE performer in the Caribbean.
 Winner of 2015 School challenge quiz competition against St. Jago High School
JCDC Marcus Garvey Award winner 6 years Straight 2011-2017
Referenced in "Young Don The Sauce God" video: https://www.youtube.com/watch?v=7vOyusxDMCo
Former high school of Grammy-award winning reggae artist Koffee 
 Former high school of notable dancehall artist Alkaline
 Former high school of 2020 Rhodes Scholar Samuel Bailey
 Former high school of youtuber Yaad Man Etan
 Runner up 2019 TVJ All Together Sing.
 Most revered high school choir in Jamaica

Winner of 2020 School challenge quiz competition against St. Jago High School Creating history with 7 titles

Alumni
Koffee
Jody-Anne Maxwell
Stephen McGregor, singer, songwriter and music producer
Joyce Britton, singer
Esther Tyson
Young Don The Sauce God, youtuber<ref
name=jg/>

References

Schools in Jamaica
Schools in Kingston, Jamaica